Dang is a district in the southeastern part of the state of Gujarat in western India. The administrative headquarters of the district are located in Ahwa. Dang has an area of 1,764 km² and a population of 228,291 (as of 2011). As of 2011, it is the least populous district of Gujarat (out of 33). As per the Planning Commission, Dang is one of the most economically distressed district out of 640 districts in India.  94% of the population belongs to one of the scheduled tribes. The five Kings of Dangs are the only hereditary royals in India whose titles are currently recognized by the government owing to an agreement made during the British Raj in 1842.

Etymology
The origin of the name of the Dang is uncertain. In common parlance the word 'dang' means a hilly village. There is another connotation of the word 'dang' which means bamboo (a place of bamboo). The name is also associated with Hindu mythology. It is related to the Dandakaranya of the Ramayana. It is said that during the exile, Rama passed through this area on his way to Nashik.

Kings of Dang

The five Royal Bhil Kings of Dangs are currently the only hereditary rulers in India.

Before Independence several wars were fought between the five tribal kings of Dang and the British Raj. According to the history of Dang, the biggest war to took place at 'Lashkaria Amba', in when the kings of all the five states joined together to protect Dang from British rule. The British were beaten and agreed to a compromise.

As per the treaty signed in 1842 the British were allowed to use the forests and their natural products against which they had to pay around 3,000 silver coins to the five kings. Currently the kings receive a monthly political pension by the Government of India, which is the main source of their income. This payment is continued even though all privy purses for the Princely states of India were stopped in 1970 since the agreement was between then monarchy of Dangs and the British.

At the end of each fiscal year during Holi, the kings gather in Ahwa for a traditional royal ceremony, in their richly decorated buggies and bands with tribal dancers, to receive the payment as per the agreement of 1842. In ancient Indian Scriptures Dang is known as Danda Aranyaka, meaning 'Bamboo forest'. Recently the Dangs Kings have urged the government to protect their depleting forest cover due to illegal logging.

The five kingdoms are Daher-Amala, Linga, Gadhvi, Vasurna and Pimpri.

Rulers 
Linga - Raja Bhawarsinh
Daher-Amala - Raja Tapatrao Anandrao Pawar
Gadhvi - Raja Karan Singh Yashwantrao Pawar 
Vasurna - Raja Dhanrajsinh Chandrasinh Suryavanshi
Pimpri - Raja Trikamrao Sahebrao Pawar

Demographics

According to the 2011 census, Dang district has a population of 228,291, roughly equal to the nation of Vanuatu. This gives it a ranking of 587th in India (out of a total of 640). Its population growth rate over the decade 2001-2011 was 21.44%. Dang has a sex ratio of 1007 females for every 1000 males, and literacy rate of 76.8%. 10.81% of the population lives in urban areas. Scheduled Castes and Scheduled Tribes make up 0.43% and 94.65% of the population respectively.

Language

At the time of the 2011 Census of India, 59.59% of the population in the district spoke Dangi, 32.55% Gujarati, 3.18% Gamit, 2.00% Marathi and 1.21% Hindi as their first language.

Politics
  

|}

Economy
In 2006 the Ministry of Panchayati Raj named Dang District as an economically distressed district, one of 250 out of a total of 640 districts. It is one of the six districts in Gujarat currently receiving funds from the Backward Regions Grant Fund Programme (BRGF).

Forest
Dang District has part of a forest that includes Purna Wildlife Sanctuary, which is shared between the districts of Dang and Tapi in Gujarat and Nandurbar District in Maharashtra, and Vansda National Park in Navsari District, which shares a continuous tract of forest with Valsad district.

A rusty-spotted cat was sighted for the time in 1991 in Shoolpaneshwar Wildlife Sanctuary.

In Purna and Ratanmahal Wildlife Sanctuarys, eight bird species are considered locally extinct, including Indian grey hornbill, jungle bush quail, red spurfowl and large woodshrike. Also, Bengal tiger, Indian giant squirrel and gaur are reportedly extinct in Gujarat.

Talukas
 Subir
 Waghai
 Ahwa

Rivers of district
 Purna River
 Ambika River
 Gira River
 Khapri River
 Dhodad River

See also
 Valley and District of Dang in Nepal
 Dang, Uttar Pradesh
 Dang, Iran
 Gulf of Khambhat

Places of interest 
 Botanic Garden, Waghai - Large Government Ayurvedic Medicinal Garden (Botanical Garden) near Waghai
 Gira Falls on Ambika River near Waghai
 Hill stations: Saputara and Don
 Gira Falls on Gira River at Girmal village
 Shabri Dham and Pampa Sarovar at Subir

References

External links
 Official website
 Dang District Panchayat-Official web
 Are there tigers in the Dangs?

Districts of Gujarat
Dang district, India